Woolooman is a rural locality in the Scenic Rim Region, Queensland, Australia.

History 
Woolooman Provisional School opened on 9 March 1908. On 1 January it became Woolooman State School.  It closed in 1913 due to low attendances. The school re-opened on 21 Aug 1933 as Woolooman State School. It closed permanently in 1937.

References 

Scenic Rim Region
Localities in Queensland